Luton is a town located in Woodbury County, Iowa, United States. It is part of the Sioux City/Nebraska/South Dakota Metropolitan Statistical Area.

Luton has a population of 370 people, according to the U.S. Census Bureau in the year 2000. Most of the youths residing there attend school at the Sergeant Bluff-Luton School District.

Geography
Luton is located at 42°20′23″N, 96°13′35″W (42.339722, -96.226389)GR1.

According to the United States Census Bureau, the city has a total area of 1.8 km² (0.7 sq mi). 0.7 square miles (1.7 km2) of it is land and 1.47% is water. Luton is located on the floodplain of the Missouri River, near Interstate 29. Brown's Lake/Bigelow County Park and Snyder Bend County Park are nearby.

History
Luton's population was 98 in 1902, and 200 in 1925.

Demographics

As of the census GR2 of 2000, there were 370 people, 154 households, and 97 families residing in the city. The racial makeup of the city was 100.00% White.

There were 154 households, out of which 31.2% had children under the age of 18 living with them, 51.9% were married couples living together, 7.8% had a female householder with no husband present, and 36.4% were non-families. 34.4% of all households were made up of individuals, and 14.3% had someone living alone who was 65 years of age or older. The average household size was 2.40 and the average family size was 3.11.

In the city, the population was spread out, with 28.9% under the age of 18, 3.2% from 18 to 24, 32.4% from 25 to 44, 17.8% from 45 to 64, and 17.6% who were 65 years of age or older. The median age was 36 years. For every 100 females, there were 89.7 males. For every 100 females age 18 and over, there were 93.4 males.

The median income for a household in the city was $27,396, and the median income for a family was $37,500. Males had a median income of $30,250 versus $21,250 for females. The per capita income for the city was $15,242. About 5.2% of families and 9.4% of the population were below the poverty line, including 10.1% of those under age 18 and 5.5% of those age 65 or over.

Education
The Sergeant Bluff-Luton Community School District operates local area public schools.

References

Cities in Woodbury County, Iowa
Cities in Iowa